Arhopala alexandrae is a butterfly in the family Lycaenidae. It was described by Schröder & Treadaway in 1978. It is endemic to the  Philippines (Bohol, Mindanao, Panay, Luzon, and Marinduque) in the Indomalayan realm.

References

External links
Arhopala Boisduval, 1832 at Markku Savela's Lepidoptera and Some Other Life Forms. Retrieved June 3, 2017.

Arhopala
Insects of the Philippines
Butterflies described in 1978